Arild Mathisen (born 14 March 1942, in Drammen) is a Norwegian former international footballer. On club level Mathisen played for Åssiden, Vålerenga and Strømsgodset. He won one league-title with Vålerenga in 1965, and another with Strømsgodset in 1970. He also won the Norwegian cup in 1969 and 1970 with Godset. Internationally he was capped 29 times.

References

External links 
 

1942 births
Living people
Sportspeople from Drammen
Norwegian footballers
Norway international footballers
Vålerenga Fotball players
Strømsgodset Toppfotball players
Association footballers not categorized by position